The National University of Santiago del Estero is an Argentine national university located in the capital of Santiago del Estero Province. Its 1973 establishment gathered the existing Tucumán University school of agronomy (1949) and the Córdoba University forestry institute (1958), as well as new schools created for the purpose.

1973 establishments in Argentina
Santiago del Estero
Educational institutions established in 1973
Universities in Santiago del Estero Province